Kanagasabai Ganeshalingam (3 January 1938 – 4 December 2006) was a Sri Lankan Tamil politician. He was Mayor of Colombo.

Early life and family
Ganeshalingam was born on 3 January 1938 in Puloly in northern Ceylon. He was the son of Kanagasabai, a proctor, and Parvathipillai.

He was educated at the Hartley College and S. Thomas' College, Mount Lavinia. After school he joined the University of Ceylon where he was an elected officer of the student union.

Ganeshalingam married Yamuna, daughter of Dr. Sri Pathmanathan. They had a son (Kandeepan) and a daughter (Menaka). Ganeshalingam was a Hindu.

Career
After university Ganeshalingam joined Ford Rhodes Thornton & Co as an accountancy student. He then entered business. He was director of the Tobacco Corporation and several other state organisations. He was also chairman of Ceylon Oxygen.

Ganeshalingam joined the United National Party (UNP) in 1960. He was appointed treasurer of the UNP in 1989. He was later elected to Colombo Municipal Council as a UNP candidate. He served as Deputy Mayor of Colombo between July 1991 and the end of 1993. He was acting Mayor of Colombo from January 1994 to June 1996 before serving as Mayor of Colombo between June 1996 and March 1997. He resigned from the UNP in January 1997. He then contested the 1997 election as a candidate of an independent group backed by the People's Alliance. He was re-elected to CMC and served as Leader of the Opposition from May 1997 to April 2002.

Death
Ganeshalingam died in Colombo on 4 December 2006.

References

1938 births
2006 deaths
Alumni of Hartley College
Alumni of S. Thomas' College, Mount Lavinia
Alumni of the University of Ceylon
Mayors of Colombo
People from Northern Province, Sri Lanka
Sri Lankan Hindus
Sri Lankan Tamil accountants
Sri Lankan Tamil businesspeople
Sri Lankan Tamil politicians
United National Party politicians